The Rain is a Danish post-apocalyptic streaming television series created by Jannik Tai Mosholt, Esben Toft Jacobsen and Christian Potalivo. It premiered on Netflix on 4 May 2018. The show stars Alba August, Lucas Lynggaard Tønnesen, Mikkel Følsgaard, Lukas Løkken, Jessica Dinnage, Sonny Lindberg, and Angela Bundalovic, with Lars Simonsen, Bertil De Lorenhmad, Evin Ahmad, and Johannes Bah Kuhnke in recurring roles. The latter two become main characters in the second season.

On 30 May 2018, Netflix renewed The Rain for a second season, which was released on 17 May 2019, with 6 episodes. In June 2019, it was confirmed that the series was renewed for a third and final season, which was released on 6 August 2020.

Premise
When a virus that is carried by rainfall wipes out almost all humans in Scandinavia, Danish siblings Simone and Rasmus take shelter in a bunker. Six years later, they emerge to search for their father, a scientist who left them in the bunker but never returned. Along the way, they join a group of young survivors and together they travel across Denmark and Sweden, searching for a safe place, and for the siblings' father, who may be able to provide answers and a cure.

Cast

Main
 Alba August as Simone Andersen
 Lucas Lynggaard Tønnesen as Rasmus Andersen
 Mikkel Følsgaard as Martin
 Lukas Løkken as Patrick
 Jessica Dinnage as Lea (seasons 1–2)
 Sonny Lindberg as Jean
 Angela Bundalovic as Beatrice (season 1)
 Natalie Madueño as Fie (season 2–3)
 Clara Rosager as Sarah (season 2–3)
 Evin Ahmad as Kira (season 2–3)
 Johannes Bah Kuhnke as Sten (recurring, season 1; main, season 2–3)
 Rex Leonard as Daniel (season 3)

Recurring
 Lars Simonsen as Dr. Frederik Andersen, Simone and Rasmus' father (seasons 1–2)
 Jacob Luhmann as Thomas, Apollon "stranger" (seasons 1–2)
 Iben Hjejle as Ellen Andersen, Simone and Rasmus' mother (season 1)
 Bertil De Lorenzi as Young Rasmus (seasons 1–2)
 Anders Juul as Jakob, Sarah's older brother (season 2)
 Cecilia Loffredo as Luna (season 3)

Episodes

Series overview

Season 1 (2018)

Season 2 (2019)

Season 3 (2020)

Production
Production on Season 1 commenced in late June 2017 in Denmark and Sweden.

Netflix announced on 30 May 2018 that the series would go into production for a second season at the end of 2018. The second season premiered on Netflix on 17 May 2019.

Season 3 of The Rain premiered on Netflix on 6 August 2020.

References

External links
  on Netflix
 
 

2018 Danish television series debuts
2020 Danish television series endings
Danish drama television series
Dystopian television series
Post-apocalyptic television series
Post-apocalyptic web series
Zombie web series
Danish-language Netflix original programming
Television shows filmed in Sweden
Television shows set in Europe
Television shows set in Denmark
Television shows set in Sweden